Wombles Creek is a  long 2nd order tributary to the Cape Fear River in Lee County, North Carolina.  This is the only stream of this name in the United States.

Course
Wombles Creek rises about 0.5 miles southwest of Blacknel, North Carolina and then flows southeast to join the Cape Fear River about 2 miles southeast of Moncure, North Carolina.

Watershed
Wombles Creek drains  of area, receives about 47.7 in/year of precipitation, has a wetness index of 451.79 and is about 60% forested.

See also
List of rivers of North Carolina

References

Rivers of North Carolina
Rivers of Lee County, North Carolina
Tributaries of the Cape Fear River